Penny Dann (30 June 1964 – 20 December 2014) was a British children's book illustrator and creator of The Secret Fairy.

References

1964 births
2014 deaths
British children's book illustrators